Winter Oranges is a live album by composer Graham Collier accompanied by the Danish Radio Jazz Orchestra featuring a four-part composition written especially for the group which was released on the Jazzprint label in 2002.

Reception

Allmusic said "The well-rehearsed orchestra, which has long performed original works by Collier, interprets these difficult pieces well, with tight sound and universally strong solos ... Through the years Collier has consistently showed an affinity for nuance, color, and texture without sacrificing the emotional spontaneity that is at the heart of jazz, somewhat in the vein of Gil Evans. Collier continues to hone his craft, and the results here testify to his past achievements and continued creativity".

Track listing
All compositions by Graham Collier.

 "Three Simple Pieces: Part One" - 5:48
 "Three Simple Pieces: Part Three" - 6:48
 "Winter Oranges: Blue Spring" - 9:21
 "Winter Oranges: Eggshell Summer" - 13:41
 "Winter Oranges: Tinted Autumn" - 6:03
 "Winter Oranges: Winter Oranges" - 7:44

Personnel

Graham Collier – composer
Anders Gustafsson – trumpet, flugelhorn
Benny Rosenfeld – trumpet, flugelhorn
Thomas Fryland – trumpet, flugelhorn
Henrik Bolberg – trumpet, flugelhorn
Knud Erik Norregaard – trumpet, flugelhorn
Vincent Nilsson – trombone
Steen Hansen – trombone
Peter Jensen – trombone
Annette Husby – trombone
Axel Windfeld – bass trombone, tuba
Michael Hove – alto saxophone, soprano saxophone, clarinet
Nikolai Schultz – alto saxophone, soprano saxophone, alto flute
Uffe Markussen – tenor saxophone, clarinet, bass clarinet
Tomas Franck – tenor saxophone, soprano saxophone
Flemming Madsen – baritone saxophone, bass clarinet
Nikolaj Bentzon – piano
Thomas Ovesen – bass
Anders Chico Lindvall – guitar
Soren Frost – drums
Ethan Weisgard – percussion

References

2002 live albums
Graham Collier live albums